Haplochromis xanthopteryx is a species of cichlid endemic to Lake Victoria where it is only known to occur in the Mwanza Gulf in areas with rocky substrates.  This species can reach a length of  SL.  It can also be found in the aquarium trade.  This species may be placed back in the genus Lithochromis when a comprehensive review of Haplochromis is carried out.

References

xanthopteryx
Fish of Tanzania
Fish described in 1998
Fish of Lake Victoria
Taxonomy articles created by Polbot